Sean Michael Elliott (born February 2, 1968) is an American former professional basketball player who starred at small forward in both the college and professional ranks.  He attended the University of Arizona, where he had a standout career as a two-time All-American, winner of the 1989 John R. Wooden Award, the 1989 Adolph Rupp Trophy, the 1989 NABC Player of the Year, 1989 AP Player of the Year, and two time Pac-12 Player of the Year (in 1988–1989).

He was the third pick of the 1989 NBA draft, was named to the 1990 NBA All-Rookie Second Team, was a two-time NBA All-Star, and earned an NBA championship in 1999.

His #32 is retired by both the University of Arizona and the San Antonio Spurs.

Early life
Elliott was born in Tucson, Arizona, as the youngest of three boys. He attended the G.A.T.E. (Gifted and Talented Education) program at Tolson Elementary School there, then played basketball at Cholla High School (now Cholla High Magnet School) on the city's west side.

College
After graduating in 1985, he remained in Tucson to play college basketball at the University of Arizona. Under the tutelage of Lute Olson, Elliott was named Pac-10 Freshman of the Year. He was selected as a consensus all-American during his junior and senior years, and led the Wildcats to the Final Four in his junior year (1988). Elliott broke Lew Alcindor's (Kareem Abdul-Jabbar) all time Pac-10 career scoring record.  After an exceptional senior season, Elliott won the Wooden Award.  He is still the University of Arizona's all-time leading scorer.

He played for the US national team in the 1986 FIBA World Championship, winning the gold medal.

NCAA career statistics 

|-
| align="left" | 1985–86
| align="left" | Arizona
| 32 || ... || 33.7 || .486 || ... || .749 || 5.3 || 2.2 || 0.7 || 0.3 || 15.6
|-
| align="left" | 1986–87
| align="left" | Arizona
| 30 || ... || 34.9 || .510 || .371 || .770 || 6.0 || 3.7 || 0.7 || 0.2 || 19.3
|-
| align="left" | 1987–88
| align="left" | Arizona
| 38 || ... || 32.9 || .570 || .471 || .793 || 5.8 || 3.6 || 0.7 || 0.4 || 19.6
|-
| align="left" | 1988–89
| align="left" | Arizona
| 33 || ... || 34.1 || .480 || .504 || .841 || 7.2 || 4.1 || 1.0 || 0.3 || 22.3
|-
| align="left" | Career
| align="left" | ...
| 133 || ... || 33.8 || .512 || .456 || .793 || 6.1 || 3.4 || 0.8 || 0.3 || 19.2
|-

NBA career

San Antonio Spurs (1989–1993)
Elliott was drafted by the San Antonio Spurs as the third pick in the first round of the 1989 NBA draft. Elliot started in 69 of 81 games for the season and averaged 10 points a game. The Spurs made the playoffs where they swept the Denver Nuggets in the first round before falling to the eventual Western Conference Champion Portland Trail Blazers in 7 games.

In the following season, Elliott was moved to the permanent starting line-up and increased his scoring to 15.9 points a game. The Spurs won 55 games but lost in the first round of the playoffs to the Golden State Warriors in four games. Elliott averaged 16.3 points per game during the 1991–92 season but San Antonio were swept in the first round by the Phoenix Suns.

During the 1992–93 season, Elliott averaged 17.2 points per game, including a career-high 41 points against the Dallas Mavericks on December 18, 1992. He was named to play in the 1993 NBA All-Star Game alongside teammate David Robinson. In the playoffs, San Antonio defeated Portland 3 games to 1, before facing the number one seeded Suns in the conference semifinal. After losing the first two games in Phoenix, the Spurs responded with consecutive games at home, as Elliott scored 17 points in game 3 and 19 points in game 4. The Suns managed to wrap up the series in the next two games. Elliot averaged 15.8 points per game in the playoffs.

Detroit Pistons (1993–1994)
Elliott spent the 1993–94 season with the Detroit Pistons after being traded for Dennis Rodman in a multi-player deal. After Elliott struggled with the Pistons, the Pistons attempted to trade him to the eventual champion Houston Rockets in February 1994 in exchange for Robert Horry, Matt Bullard and two second-round draft choices; the trade fell through when Elliott failed his physical. After the trade was voided, Elliott held a press conference and announced that he had a kidney problem. Elliott remained in Detroit for the rest of the season and averaged 12.1 points per game. Following the end of the season, he was traded back to the Spurs for the draft rights of Bill Curley.

Return to San Antonio Spurs (1994–1998)
In the 1994–1995 season, the Spurs won 62 games under the leadership of Elliott and the season's NBA Most Valuable Player Robinson. The Spurs clinched the top seed in the Western Conference, and swept the Denver Nuggets in the first round before facing the young Los Angeles Lakers in the semifinals. Elliott scored 26 points – his high for the playoffs – in the series-clinching game against the Lakers. The Spurs lost to the Houston Rockets in the conference finals.

The 1995–1996 season was a personal best for Elliott, as he averaged 20 points a game, a career high, in 77 games.  Elliott also made a career-high 161 three-pointers on the season. He played in the 1996 NBA All-Star Game and scored 13 points. The following season, Elliott suffered injuries that limited him to 39 games. Injuries limited him again to just 36 games in the 1997–1998 season.

NBA championship, kidney transplant, and comeback (1998–2001)
The 1998–1999 season was shortened to 50 games as a result of a league lockout, but the Spurs won 37 of the games for the west's best record led by Duncan and Robinson, with Elliott starting in all 50 games with an average of 11.2 points a game.  The Spurs defeated the Minnesota Timberwolves and Los Angeles Lakers to face the Portland Trail Blazers in the conference finals. During game 2, the Trail Blazers held a 2-point lead with 9 seconds left to play in regulation. Elliott received a pass nearly stolen by Blazer Stacey Augmon in the corner, before Elliott caught the ball within an inch of the sideline. He managed to stay on his tiptoes rather than planting his feet, before releasing a 21-foot three-point attempt just over the outstretched arms of 6 foot 11 forward Rasheed Wallace. The shot went in, giving the Spurs a 1-point lead and the eventual victory. The shot was named the "Memorial Day Miracle" because of its improbability and the date on which it was made. Elliott finished the game with 22 points. The Spurs made the NBA Finals and faced the New York Knicks. The Spurs defeated the Knicks in five games to win their first NBA Championship. Elliott averaged 11.9 points in 17 games in the playoffs while shooting 40 percent from beyond the three-point arc.

Shortly after the championship run, Elliott announced that he had a kidney disease known as focal segmental glomerulosclerosis, that his kidney function was worsening, and that he would require a transplant as soon as a matching donor became available. Elliott also disclosed that he had been aware of his kidney ailment since 1993. He underwent surgery on August 16, 1999, after he received a kidney from his older brother, Noel.

On March 13, 2000, in a game against the Atlanta Hawks, Elliott became the first professional athlete to return to his sport after the kidney transplant. He played in only 19 games in the 1999–2000 season. Elliott started in 34 of 52 games in the 2000–2001 season; the Spurs held the best record in the league, but lost to the eventual champion Los Angeles Lakers in the Western Conference Finals.

Retirement
Elliott announced his retirement in 2001. He finished his career averaging 14.2 points, 4.3 rebounds, and 2.6 assists per game. Elliott is the fifth all-time franchise leader in three-point field goals made (563) and fourth for three-point attempts (1,485).

NBA career statistics

Regular season 

|-
| align="left" | 1989–90
| align="left" | San Antonio
| 81 || 69 || 25.1 || .481 || .111 || .866 || 3.7 || 1.9 || 0.6 || 0.2 || 10.0
|-
| align="left" | 1990–91
| align="left" | San Antonio
| 82 || 82 || 37.1 || .490 || .313 || .808 || 5.6 || 2.9 || 0.8 || 0.4 || 15.9
|-
| align="left" | 1991–92
| align="left" | San Antonio
| 82 || 82 || 38.0 || .494 || .305 || .861 || 5.4 || 2.6 || 1.0 || 0.4 || 16.3
|-
| align="left" | 1992–93
| align="left" | San Antonio
| 70 || 70 || 37.2 || .491 || .356 || .798 || 4.6 || 3.8 || 1.0 || 0.4 || 17.2
|-
| align="left" | 1993–94
| align="left" | Detroit
| 73 || 73 || 33.0 || .455 || .299 || .803 || 3.6 || 2.7 || 0.7 || 0.4 || 12.1
|-
| align="left" | 1994–95
| align="left" | San Antonio
| 81 || 81 || 35.3 || .468 || .408 || .807 || 3.5 || 2.5 || 1.0 || 0.5 || 18.1
|-
| align="left" | 1995–96
| align="left" | San Antonio
| 77 || 77 || 37.7 || .466 || .411 || .771 || 5.1 || 2.7 || 0.9 || 0.4 || 20.0
|-
| align="left" | 1996–97
| align="left" | San Antonio
| 39 || 39 || 35.7 || .422 || .333 || .755 || 4.9 || 3.2 || 0.6 || 0.6 || 14.9
|-
| align="left" | 1997–98
| align="left" | San Antonio
| 36 || 36 || 28.1 || .403 || .378 || .718 || 3.4 || 1.7 || 0.7 || 0.4 || 9.3
|-
| style="text-align:left;background:#afe6ba;" | 1998–99†
| align="left" | San Antonio
| 50 || 50 || 30.2 || .410 || .328 || .757 || 4.3 || 2.3 || 0.5 || 0.3 || 11.2
|-
| align="left" | 1999–2000
| align="left" | San Antonio
| 19 || 19 || 20.6 || .358 || .351 || .781 || 2.5 || 1.5 || 0.6 || 0.1 || 6.0
|-
| align="left" | 2000–01
| align="left" | San Antonio
| 52 || 34 || 23.6 || .434 || .426 || .714 || 3.3 || 1.6 || 0.4 || 0.5 || 7.9
|- class="sortbottom"
| style="text-align:center;" colspan="2"| Career
| 742 || 712 || 33.0 || .465 || .375 || .800 || 4.3 || 2.6 || 0.8 || 0.4 || 14.2
|- class="sortbottom"
| style="text-align:center;" colspan="2"| All-Star
| 2 || 0 || 18.5 || .333 || .333 || .800 || 3.5 || 1.0 || 0.0 || 0.0 || 9.0

Playoffs 

|-
| align="left" | 1990
| align="left" | San Antonio
| 10 || 10 || 29.1 || .552 || .000 || .724 || 4.1 || 1.8 || 0.9 || 0.6 || 12.7
|-
| align="left" | 1991
| align="left" | San Antonio
| 4 || 4 || 33.0 || .425 || .000 || .781 || 5.5 || 4.0 || 1.0 || 0.3 || 14.8
|-
| align="left" | 1992
| align="left" | San Antonio
| 3 || 3 || 45.7 || .475 || .625 || .889 || 4.3 || 2.7 || 1.0 || 1.3 || 19.7
|-
| align="left" | 1993
| align="left" | San Antonio
| 10 || 10 || 38.1 || .472 || .214 || .925 || 4.8 || 3.6 || 0.8 || 0.3 || 15.8
|-
| align="left" | 1995
| align="left" | San Antonio
| 15 || 15 || 38.3 || .435 || .364 || .776 || 4.8 || 2.7 || 0.7 || 0.5 || 17.3
|-
| align="left" | 1996
| align="left" | San Antonio
| 10 || 10 || 38.9 || .402 || .294 || .797 || 3.9 || 2.5 || 1.1 || 0.4 || 15.5
|-
| style="text-align:left;background:#afe6ba;" | 1999†
| align="left" | San Antonio
| 17 || 17 || 33.8 || .444 || .400 || .763 || 3.4 || 2.6 || 0.5 || 0.2 || 11.9
|-
| align="left" | 2000
| align="left" | San Antonio
| 4 || 4 || 29.8 || .375 || .385 || .625 || 5.5 || 1.3 || 0.0 || 0.5 || 10.0
|-
| align="left" | 2001
| align="left" | San Antonio
| 12 || 0 || 19.9 || .373 || .364 || 1.000 || 2.2 || 1.2 || 0.4 || 0.5 || 4.8
|- class="sortbottom"
| style="text-align:center;" colspan="2"| Career
| 85 || 73 || 33.4 || .445 || .356 || .801 || 4.0 || 2.4 || 0.7 || 0.4 || 13.2

Post-NBA
After retiring, Elliott became a basketball analyst for The NBA on NBC and, during the 2003–2004 season, for ABC Sports and ESPN. He left that position for the 2004–2005 season and became the color commentator for the Spurs' local broadcasting.  On January 5, 2013, he joined Fox Sports 1, calling his first college basketball game with the network.

On March 6, 2005, his #32 was retired by the San Antonio Spurs and was hung in the rafters of the AT&T Center.
His #32 is also retired by the University of Arizona.

References

External links

1968 births
Living people
20th-century African-American sportspeople
21st-century African-American people
1986 FIBA World Championship players
African-American basketball players
All-American college men's basketball players
American men's basketball players
Arizona Wildcats men's basketball players
Basketball players from Tucson, Arizona
Competitors at the 1986 Goodwill Games
Detroit Pistons players
FIBA World Championship-winning players
Kidney transplant recipients
McDonald's High School All-Americans
Medalists at the 1987 Summer Universiade
National Basketball Association All-Stars
National Basketball Association players with retired numbers
San Antonio Spurs announcers
San Antonio Spurs draft picks
San Antonio Spurs players
Small forwards
United States men's national basketball team players
Universiade medalists in basketball
Universiade silver medalists for the United States